Biblical sandals (sandalim tanakhim), also called Tanakhi sandals and Khugistic sandals (sandalim ḥugistim), are sandals consisting of a sole with two leather straps that pass across the top of the foot, and one around the heel. The leather is usually brown or black. The term is widely used by manufacturers in Israel.

History
The source of Biblical sandals is ancient. They appear in wall paintings found in archaeological digs dating the Old Testament in the Levant and were not very different from those used in Rome and Egypt. Reminders of such sandals were found at Masada and the Cave of Letters. In ancient times those sandals were made of non-processed leather and dry grass, and had strings or ropes made of simple, cheap materials. Though, sometimes golden or silver beads and even gems were added.
  
In modern times, Biblical sandals are a symbol of Zionism. Israeli pioneer settlers and Israeli born Jews used them to show the return to the clothing worn by the ancestors, and fit the climate. The harsh economic situation of the Zionists before the establishment of Israel, and of the Israelis in the 1940s to the 1960s, including the period of austerity in Israel, made those low-cost sandals a part of the proud-poor countryside or kibbutz fashion. The style contrasted with the more ostentatious attire of the city inhabitants who were European-influenced. Later, the city inhabitants started wearing these sandals too, especially after their popularization by Nimrod in Tel Aviv.

Modern manufacturers known for making Biblical sandals include Nimrod, Jerusalem Sandals, Shoresh, and Teva Naot. The sandals are also sometimes worn by members of the Knesset, Israel's parliament, while the Knesset is in session.

An exhibit on Biblical sandals and Israeli culture was opened at the Eretz Israel Museum in July 2018.

See also
 Tembel hat
 Israeli fashion
 Culture of Israel

References

Israeli fashion
Middle Eastern clothing
Sandals
Folk footwear
1940s fashion
1950s fashion
1960s fashion
1970s fashion